Martina Navratilova was the defending champion, but did not compete this year.

Steffi Graf won the title by defeating Arantxa Sánchez Vicario 6–1, 6–2 in the final.

Seeds
The first four seeds received a bye into the second round.

Draw

Finals

Top half

Bottom half

References

External links
 Official results archive (ITF)
 Official results archive (WTA)

Toray Pan Pacific Open
Pan Pacific Open
1990 Toray Pan Pacific Open